A Stutenkerl belongs to the Saint Nicholas tradition in the German-speaking countries.

The pastry often features raisins in the place of eyes and a clay pipe. The pipe may have to do with the Reformation, to make the originally catholic bishop figure more secular.

See also 
 Gingerbread man

References

External links 
Stutenkerl in rezeptewiki
Stutenkerl recipes at chefkoch.de

Christmas food
German pastries
Austrian pastries
Swiss pastries
Liechtenstein cuisine